A. gracilis may refer to:

 Acanthorhodeus gracilis, the Khanka spiny bitterling, a temperate freshwater fish species
 Aechmea gracilis, a plant species endemic to Brazil
 Aepyornis gracilis, an extinct bird species
 Aglaia gracilis, a plant species endemic to Fiji
 Aldrovandia gracilis, a fish species
 Ameles gracilis, a praying mantis species found on the Canary Islands
 Ammania gracilis, the large ammannia, red ammannia or pink ammannia, a plant species
 Anas gracilis, the grey teal, a dabbling duck species found in open wetlands in New Guinea, Australia, New Zealand, Vanuatu and Solomon
 Andropadus gracilis, the grey greenbul, a songbird species
 Anubias gracilis, a palm species
 Archimantis gracilis, a praying mantis species
 Argonauta gracilis, the knobby argonaut, a pelagic octopus species
 Arnica gracilis, the slender leopardbane, a plant species of the genus Arnica
 Asterella gracilis, a bryophyte species in the genus Asterella
 Atelopus gracilis, the rana jambato del Pacífico, a toad species
 Austromenidia gracilis, a fish species endemic to Chile

Synonyms
 Araneus gracilis, a synonym for Argiope argentata, a spider species
 Autographa gracilis, a synonym for Plusia putnami, a moth species

See also
 Gracilis (disambiguation)